E 573 is a B-class European route connecting Püspökladány in Hungary to Uzhhorod in Ukraine. The route is approximately 193 km long. Its national number in Hungary is 4. Formerly, it began in Nyíregyháza as its southern part was called E77.

Route and E-road junctions
The E 573 routes through two European countries:

 (on shared signage , except for a 23 km  to  shared signage bypass of Nyíregyháza)
 Püspökladány:  
 Debrecen:  
 Záhony (near Ukrainian border)

 (on shared signage )
Chop (near Hungarian border)
Uzhhorod: 

References

External links 
 UN Economic Commission for Europe: Overall Map of E-road Network (2007)
 International E-road network

International E-road network
European routes in Ukraine
Roads in Hungary